Season were an English rock band from Birmingham.

Name 
After the band had their first show booked for 14 December 1998 (Matt's 18th birthday, by coincidence) they had no name to promote the show with. Looking into his college bag, Matt pulled out a CD by Northern Irish rockers 'Ash', called 'Trailer'. The first track on it was called Season. They also used the font for the band logo. Before deciding on this name, they flirted with names such as: Bomb (a Bush song from their album Sixteen Stone), Flirt, Anavrin ('Nirvana' backwards).

History

Formation and early years: 1997–2005 
Matt and Gary Steeles met in school in 1996, with a keen common interest in Nirvana, they began to hang out and talk about how cool it would be to be in a band. They started 'Anavrin' just before their exams in 1997, with Gary teaching Matt how to play the guitar, and Gary taking up bass. Later in 1997, mutual school friend Simon Hartland joined on guitar - he being the person who had gotten Matt into rock music over the previous couple of years. The three looked for a drummer, and eventually did two gigs with session drummer Paul Wall.

In 1999 Simon announced that he would be leaving Birmingham to study in Nottingham. Matt and Gary were to continue with Season, and very quickly found a drummer, Steve Dale, to complete the three piece.

The mid/end of 1999 saw Season doing regular rehearsals for the first time, as they now had a complete lineup for the first time. Several demos were recorded, and gigs were arranged for 2000/2001.

In August 2001, Season had their first headline show arranged at the band's favourite venue, The Flapper (& Firkin), only for Steve to pull out of the gig with only a few days notice. A friend of Matt's was in a band and was sure his drummer would fill in, to avoid cancelling the show. The new drummer was a step in the right direction, professional and easily the best musician 
in the band. Matt and Gary agreed wanted him on a permanent basis. After a few nights out, Matt finally asked Steve Cooper to become a full-time member of Season.

The band gigged heavily and recorded many demos, which led to the 'Disillusion' demo compilation release. Many record labels showed a passing interest in the band, but nothing more.

Towards the end of 2002, Season gigged with 'Katies Ego', and loved the style and energy of guitarist Bren O'Mahony. The band struck up a friendship with Bren, and later it was agreed he should join Season. Talk of a second guitarist had been ongoing throughout 2002.

In 2003, the now four-piece Season released a demo EP 'Nothing Doing', and continued to gig constantly around the UK.

In 2005, 'Incubator Records' - a project record label based at a Birmingham College, approached Season to sign with them. The band would have unlimited access to free professional studio time, and a team of industry experts at their call. Soon after the first recording session for new album 'Bromide', Gary Steeles emailed the band to say he was quitting.

Bromide & Turn The Corner (2005–2009)

Recording sessions for 'Bromide' continued, whilst the band auditioned new bass players. Nuno Lourenço was soon the newest member of 'Season'. Again, his professionalism and knowledge pushed the band further and harder than ever before.

Season were hopeful of a succession of large local support slots after their manager, Matt Aiello, also became the general manager/promoter of the Birmingham Barfly when it opened in 2006. Season were first support on the opening night, the first band to ever play Birmingham Barfly, supporting Engercia and Reuben - who had used the night as a release party for their second album, Very Fast, Very Dangerous.

Unfortunately, soon after Matt Aiello left the Barfly and severed ties with Season, leaving the band looking at different ways of promoting themselves.

'Bromide' was finally released in 2006, by which time Incubator Records was being wound up, with no support on the release, the album had a few semi-promising reviews and was mainly sold at gigs and from the band's website.

The turn of 2006/2007 saw Bren leave Season; a combination of frustrations with the musical style / direction of the band, and Matt's frustrations with the whole Season 'apathy' that saw Matt start up a side project (Certo Sermo).

David Patterson joined Season at the start of 2007, and toured 'Bromide' with the band. With Dave's recording knowledge, Season set upon building their own recording studio in the centre of Birmingham, which is where 'Turn The Corner' was written, rehearsed and recorded.

The band continued to gig consistently around the UK, whilst recording the album, but this led to slow work on the much needed new CD. Matt's frustrations led to him refusing to gig until the album was finished. This meant Season played very few shows for 18 months whilst they worked on the album. Turn The Corner was finally finished at the end of 2008, but by this time Matt had already grown impatient and tired of the general apathy for Season within the band.

The last show to date was March 2009, supporting Bren's new band The Lowlifes at Edwards No. 8.

Future releases 
Season had rehearsed an album worth of new material for several months, even gigging much of it, whilst they waited for Turn The Corner to be completed. There has been speculative talk about this material being recorded by the band, but it seems more likely that Matt will release these songs under his solo project, possibly all on one CD.

Current projects 
Matt started writing for a new band towards the end of 2008, which at the start of 2009 led to him forming 'Lonestate'. More frustrations within the new band set up have led to Matt pursuing a solo career.

Musical influences 
English band Bush and the singer Gavin Rossdale had a huge effect on Matt in the mid-1990s, the song 
"Little Things" is claimed to be the only reason Matt originally wanted to buy a guitar.

Scottish band Biffy Clyro soon became Matt's favorite band in 2002 after the release of their debut album Blackend Sky, and Matt started to write songs in a mix of his two favorite band's styles.

This sound and style was carried through all of Season's releases.

Band members are also fans of: 3 Colours Red, Hot Rod Circuit, Feeder, Idlewild, Gemma Hayes, Rival Schools, Far, Silverchair, Nirvana, Green Day, Foo Fighters, Reuben, Weezer, Pearl Jam.

Discography

Studio albums 
 Turn The Corner (2009) – 14-track album, 14 miles
 Bromide (2006) – 12-track album, Incubator
 Nothing Doing (2004) – 7-track EP, self-release
 Disillusion (2003) – 13 tracks demo compilation, self-release

External links 

 
 

Musical groups established in 1997
Musical groups from Birmingham, West Midlands
English alternative rock groups